Jack or Jackson Trengove is the name of two Australian rules footballers:
Jackson Trengove, (born 1990) was drafted in 2008 by Port Adelaide
Jack Trengove (footballer), (born 1991) was drafted in 2009 by Melbourne